The following is a list of libraries in Turkey. According to the Ministry of Culture and Tourism, there are 1,257 libraries as of 30 December 2022 in the country. In January 2023, Istanbul's largest library, the Rami Library, opened, having 4,200 seating capacity in  covered area.

Adana

Adıyaman

Afyonkarahisar

Ağrı

Amasya

Ankara

National libraries 
Presidential Library
National Library

Academic libraries

Public libraries
 Adnan Ötüken City Public Library
 Abdurrrahman Oğultürk Public Library
Ankara Metropolitan Municipality District Library
 Ankara Ali Dayi Children's Library
 Ankara Public Library
 Balgat Hussein Alpine Public Library
 Cebeci Public Library
 Cer Modern Art Library
 Fatih Library
 Göklerkö Public Library
 Hasanoğlan April 17 Public Library
 Karas Public Library
 Kecioren Aktepe Public Library
 Kecioren Fatih Public Library
 Kesikköprü Public Library
 Kutludüğün Public Library
 Mamak County Public Library
 Mehmet Akif Ersoy Literature Museum Library
 Oyaca Public Library
 Pursaklar House Public Library
 Sinanlı Public Library
 Sincan Yenikent Public Library
 Şentepe Public Library
 Şuayip Çalkan Public Library
 Yenimahalle District Public Library
 Yunus Emre (Esentepe) Public Library

County Public libraries
 Akyurt County Public Library
 Şereflikoçhisar Yunus Emre County Public Library
 Sincan County Public Library
 Polatli County Public Library
 Nallıhan County Public Library
 Kızılcahamam County Public Library
 Boiler County Public Library
 Haymana County Public Library
 Gölbaşı County Public Library
 Gudul County Public Library
 Çamlıdere County Public Library
 Çubuk County Public Library
 Elmadağ County Public Library
 Universe County Public Library
 Ankara Kalecik County Public Library
 Ayas County Public Library
 Bala County Public Library
 Beypazarı Mehmet Akif Ersoy County Public Library

Antalya

Artvin
 Atça District Public Library
 Aydın Province Public Library  ~60.000 books
 Aydın Kids and Youth Library
 Bozdoğan District Public Library
 Çine District Public Library
 Germencik District Public Library
 Ortaklar District Public Library
 İncirliova District Public Library
 Karacasu District Public Library
 Koçarlı District Public Library
 Kuşadası District Public Library
 Kuyucak District Public Library
 Nazilli District Public Library
 Söke Hacı Halilpaşa District Public Library
 Sarıkemer District Public Library
 Sultanhisar District Public Library
 Yenipazar District Public Library

Balıkesir

Bingöl

Bitlis

Bolu

Burdur

Bursa 
 Bursa Inebey Manuscripts
 Nilüfer Akkılıç Library

Municipality libraries 
 Nilüfer Children's Library
 Nilüfer Üçevler Library
 Nilüfer Library of Poetry

Çanakkale 
ÇOMÜ Library
Tahtakuşlar Ethnography Museum Library

Çankırı
 Ankara University Çankırı Forestry Faculty Library
 Çankırı Provincial Public Library

County Public Libraries 
 Atkaracalar Oğuz County Public Library
 Bayramören County Public Library
 Çerkeş County Public Library
 Eldivan County Public Library
 Ilgaz County Public Library
 Kızılırmak County Public Library
 Korgun 125. Yıl County Public Library
 Kurşunlu County Public Library
 Orta County Public Library
 Şabanözü County Public Library
 Yapraklı County Public Library

Çorum

Denizli 
Pamukkale University Library
Denizli Provincial Public Library
Denizli Uçancıbaşı Public Library
Denizli Bahçelievler Public Library
Denizli Uzunpınar Public Library
Acıpayam County Public Library
Acıpayam Dedebağ Public Library
Acıpayam Kelekçi Public Library
Acıpayam Yeşilyuva Public Library
Akköy Şehit Veli Öztürk County Public Library
Babadağ County Public Library
Baklan County Public Library
Bekilli County Public Library
Beyağaç County Public Library
Bozkurt County Public Library
Buldan Ali Haydar Akın County Public Library
Buldan Yenicekent Public Library
Çal County Public Library
Çal Akkent Public Library
Çardak County Public Library
75th Anniversity Çivril County Public Library
Güney County Public Library
Honaz County Public Library
Honaz Kaklık Public Library
Kale County Public Library
Sarayköy County Public Library
Serinhisar 100th Anniversary County Public Library
Tavas County Public Library
Tavas Kızılca Public Library
Tavas Kızılcabölük Public Library
Tavas Konak Public Library
Tavas Pınarlar Public Library

Diyarbakır 
Ahmet Arif Literature Museum Library

Edirne

Elazığ 
Elazığ Provincial Public Library

Erzincan

Erzurum

Eskişehir 
Library of the Chamber of Mechanical Engineers Eskişehir Branch
Eskişehir Chamber of Industry Library
Eskişehir Chamber of Commerce Library	
Eskişehir Provincial Public Library
Osmangazi Public and Children's Library
Dumlupınar Children's Library
Atatürk Children's Library

University Libraries
 Anadolu University Central Library
 Osmangazi University Central Library

Municipal Libraries
 Tepebaşı Municipality Atatürk Children's Library
 Tepebaşı Municipality Muzaffer Tokay Children's Library
 Odunpazarı Municipality Yenikent Library

County Public Libraries 
 Alpu County Public Library
 Beylikova County Public Library
 Çifteler County Public Library
 İnönü County Public Library
 Mahmudiye County Public Library
 Mihalıççık County Public Library
 Seyitgazi County Public Library
 Sivrihisar County Public Library

Gaziantep 
 İslahiye District Public Library

Giresun

Gümüşhane

Hakkari

Hatay

Isparta

Mersin

Istanbul 
 Ahmet Hamdi Tanpınar Literature Museum Library
 Ottoman Bank Archives and Research Centre
 SALT
 Press Media Museum
 Women's Library and Information Centre Foundation
 American Library, Tepebaşı
 Atatürk Library, Taksim
 Beyazıt State Library, Beyazıt
 Halide Edip Adıvar Library (Üsküdar American Academy), Bağlarbaşı
 Istanbul Celik Gulersoy Library, Sultanahmet
 Istanbul Technical University Mustafa Inan Library
 Köprülü Library
 Library of the Archaeological Museum, Sultanahmet
 Library of the French Institute, Beyoğlu
 Library of the Goethe Institute, Beyoğlu
 Library of the Islamic Research Center, ISAM (İslam Araştırmaları Merkezi), at Mayıs Üniversitesi in Bağlarbaşı
 Manuscripts Library of the Topkapı Palace, Sultanahmet
 Library of Women's Works, Haliç 
 Süleymaniye Library, Beyazıt

Izmir 
Izmir National Library
Library of Izmir French Cultural Center
Urla County Public Library

Kahramanmaraş

Kars

Kastamonu

Kayseri 
Kayseri 75th Anniversary Provincial Public Library
 Town of Ağırnas Sinan the Architect Public Library
Erkiletli Mehmet Paşa Public Library
 Town of Hisarcık Public Library
Merkez Hikmet Taş Public Library
Sinan the Architect Seljuk Public Library
Necmettin Feyzioğlu Public Library
Raşid Efendi Library of Ancient Artifacts
Bünyan-Karadayı Village Public Library
Pınarbaşı-Pazarören Public Library
Sarıoğlan 80th Anniversary Public Library
Kayseri Himmetdede Municipality Public Library
The Qadi Mahmut Waqf Library
İhsan Sarıkaya Library of Popular Sciences

Erciyes University Libraries 
Erciyes University Library of Divinity School
Erciyes University Library of Economical and Administrative Sciences 
Erciyes University Medical School Library

County Public Libraries 
Bünyan County Public Library
Develi Seyrani County Public Library
Felahiye County Public Library
Hacılar County Public Library
İncesu County Public Library
Özvatan County Public Library
Pınarbaşı County Public Library
Sarız County Public Library
Talas Fatma-Kemal Timuçin County Public Library
Tomarza County Public Library
Yahyalı County Public Library
Yeşilhisar County Public Library

Kırklareli

Kırşehir

Kocaeli

Konya 
Selçuk University Central Library

Kütahya 
Dumlupınar University Central Library

Malatya

Manisa

Mardin

Muğla 
Hoca Mustafa Efendi Provincial Public Library
Şehbal Hilmi Baydur Children's Library

Muş

Nevşehir 
Tahsin Ağa Library

Niğde

Ordu

Rize 
Rize Provincial Public Library
Taşköprü Public Library
Veliköy Public Library
Madenli Public Library
Güneyce Public Library
İsmail Kahraman Cultural Center Public Library

University Libraries
RTEU Central Library
 RTEU Divinity School Library
RTEU Educational School Library
RTEU Medical School Library
RTEU Ardeşen Professional School Library
RTEU Turgut Kıran Maritime Boarding School Library

County Public Libraries
 Ardeşen County Public Library
 Çamlıhemşin County Public Library
 Çayeli County Public Library
 Derepazarı County Public Library
 Fındıklı County Public Library
 Güneysu County Public Library
 Hemşin County Public Library
 İkizdere County Public Library
 İyidere County Public Library
 Kalkandere County Public Library
 Pazar County Public Library

Sakarya

Samsun

Siirt

Sinop

Sivas

Tekirdağ

Tokat

Trabzon 
 KTU Faik Ahmet Barutçu Library
 Trabzon Provincial Public Library
Trabzon Children's Library
Trabzon Akyazı Public Library 
Beşikdüzü Resullü Public Library 
Of Uğurlu Public Library 
Şalpazarı Geyikli Public Library 
 Joganita Trabzon Library of Soccer
 Trabzon STEM High School (former Trabzon High School) Library

County Public Libraries
 Akçaabat County Public Library 
 Araklı County Public Library 
 Arsin County Public Library 
 Beşikdüzü County Public Library 
 Çaykara County Public Library 
 Düzköy County Public Library 
 Hayrat County Public Library 
 Maçka County Public Library 
 Of County Public Library 
 Sürmene 100th Anniversary County Public Library 
 Şalpazarı County Public Library 
 Tonya County Public Library 
 Vakfıkebir County Public Library 
 Yomra County Public Library 
 İsmail Hakkı Berkmen Center of History

Tunceli

Şanlıurfa

Uşak

Van

Yozgat

Zonguldak

Aksaray

Bayburt

Karaman

Kırıkkale

Batman

Şırnak

Bartın 
 Bartın Provincial Public Library
 Bartın Arıt 75th Anniversary Public Library
 Kurucaşile County Public Library
 Ulus Culture and Arts Center County Public Library

Ardahan

Yalova

Iğdır

Yalova

Karabük

Kilis

Osmaniye

Düzce

References

 
Education in Turkey